Étienne Adolphe Piot (1831 – 1910) was a French painter known for his portraits of young women. He exhibited in the Paris Salons from 1850 to 1909. Little is known about his life.

Life

Étienne-Adolphe Piot was born 13 February 1831 in Digoin, Saône-et-Loire, France.
He moved to Paris and studied under Léon Cogniet.
He first exhibited at the Paris Salon in 1850.
In 1860 he was among the painters whose work was shown at the Exposition de Bourdeaux.
In 1864 he was living in New York City, and that year exhibited a portrait at the National Academy of Design.
In 1869 he was again living in Paris, at 21 quai Malaquais in the 6th arrondissement.
Up to 1876 he exhibited under the name of Adolphe Piot. 
Subsequently he began to also use the names Adolphe-Étienne Piot and Étienne-Adolphe Piot.

In 1873 Adolphe Piot was described as "a Parisian painter of some name in treating Italian subjects".
He was very successful commercially, taking advantage of the increasing demand for portraits from wealthy Parisians.
During the Belle Époque every debutante had to have her portrait painted, and Piot was skilled in making captivating portraits.
Piot became a member of the Société des Artistes Français in 1883.
In 1890 he received an honorable mention for the work he exhibited at 1889 Exposition Universelle.
His last Salon entry seems to have been submitted in 1909.

Work

Most of Piot's early Salon submissions were commissioned portraits of women.
With the 1870 Salon he began to exhibit genre works with titles such as Abandonée (The Abandoned), Coquetterie (Coquetry), and La Lettre (The Letter).
Adolphe Piot created expressive depictions of beautiful women, with dark backgrounds to draw attention to the subject, and also made many works showing children.
His works were innocent, picturesque and elegant, appealing to middle class tastes of the time.
An 1879 reviewer wrote,

Clarence Clark wrote in 1905 in his Art and Artists of Our Time, 

His work is held by the Musée des Beaux-Arts de Rouen and the Brooklyn Museum, New York.

Notes

Sources

External links
Bedford Fine Art Gallery
Artwork by Etienne-Adolphe Piot

1825 births
1910 deaths
19th-century French painters
People from Saône-et-Loire
20th-century French painters